Fabrizio del Monte (born 5 December 1980 in Latina, Lazio) is an Italian racing driver.

He drove for three seasons in European Formula 3000 before driving three Champ Car events in 2005, often on the strength of sponsorship.  He said he had secured Midland's third driver seat for the 2006 San Marino Grand Prix, but this fell through due to lack of sponsorship.  His place was taken by Giorgio Mondini. Del Monte was also to be the team's third driver in the Hungarian Grand Prix.

Complete Champ Car results
(key)

References

External links 
 
 
 
 

1980 births
Living people
Italian racing drivers
Italian Formula Renault 2.0 drivers
Champ Car drivers
Auto GP drivers
Porsche Supercup drivers
International GT Open drivers
24 Hours of Spa drivers

Piquet GP drivers
HVM Racing drivers